Momina Iqbal is a Pakistani television actress. She made her acting debut in 2018 with Parlour Wali Larki as female protagonist Maryam. She later on appeared in serials like Khuda Aur Muhabbat 3, Ishq Mein Kaafir, Ajnabi Lage Zindagi and Ehd-e-Wafa. In 2019, she made her film debut with Daal Chawal as Sonia.

Career
Momina Iqbal start her acting career in 2018 with Daily soap Parlour Wali Larki in lead role Maryam on Bol Channel.

In 2019, Momina made her film debut with Daal Chawal.
  
She was also seen in serials which are very popular, such as Khuda Aur Mohabbat 3, Ishq Mein Kaafir & Ehd E Wafa in a supporting role. Currently, her drama Saaya 2 is being aired on Geo Entertainment.

Filmography

Film

Short film

Television

Anthology Series

Music Video

References

Living people
Actresses from Karachi
Pakistani female models
Pakistani television actresses
21st-century Pakistani actresses
1992 births